This is a list of 2012 Uzbekistan PFL and 2012 First League transfers in the year 2012 by club. Only transfers of the Uzbek League and First League are provided. Start of the season was March 2012.

Uzbek League

Winter 2012 transfers

FK Andijan

In:

Out:

FK Buxoro
In:

 

  	 	 	 
Out:

FC Bunyodkor

In:

  

Out:

Lokomotiv Tashkent

In:

 
 
 
 
 
 
 
 

 

Out:

Mash'al Mubarek

In:

 
 
 

Out:

Metallurg Bekabad

In:

 
 
 
 

Out:

Navbahor Namangan

In:

 

  	 	 	 
Out:

Nasaf Qarshi

In:

 

Out:

FK Neftchi Farg'ona

In:

 

Out:

Olmaliq FK

In:

 
 

 

Out:

FC Pakhtakor Tashkent

In:

 

Out:

Qizilqum Zarafshon

In:

Out:

FK Samarqand-Dinamo

In:

 
 
 
 
 
 
 
 
 
 
 

Out:

FC Shurtan Guzar

In:

Out:

Summer 2012 transfers

FK Andijan

In:

Out:

FC Bunyodkor

In:

Out:

FK Buxoro

In:

Out:

Lokomotiv Tashkent

In:

 

Out:

Mash'al Mubarek

In:

 

Out:

Metallurg Bekabad

In:

Out:

Nasaf Qarshi

In:

Out:

Navbahor Namangan

In:

Out:

Olmaliq FK

In:

Out:

FC Pakhtakor

In:

Out:

Qizilqum Zarafshon

In:

Out:

FK Samarqand-Dinamo

In:

Out:

FC Shurtan Guzar

In:

 

Out:

Uzbekistan First League

Winter 2012 transfers

Chust-Pakhtakor

In:

Out:

FC Yoshlik

In:

Out:

NBU Osiyo

In:

Out:

Oqtepa Tashkent

In:

 
 

Out:

Sogdiana Jizzakh

In:

Out:

FK Yangiyer

In:

Out:

Xorazm FK Urganch

In:

Out:

Summer 2012 transfers

FC Bunyodkor-2

In:

Out:

FK Yangiyer

In:

Out:

See also

2012 Uzbek League
List of Uzbek football transfers 2010
List of Uzbek football transfers 2011

References

External links 
 Uzbekistan Professional Football League
 2012 Uzbek League winter transfers
 2012 Uzbekistan Professional Football League summer transfers

Transfers
Uzbek
2012
Uzbek